John B. Scott is an American politician and lawyer. A member of the Republican Party, he served as 114th Secretary of State of Texas from October 21, 2021 to December 31, 2022. He succeeded acting secretary Joe Esparza.

Prior to serving as secretary of state, Scott was the deputy attorney general for Civil Litigation under then-Texas Attorney General Greg Abbott. Scott was also the chief operating officer for the Health and Human Services Commission in Texas. In the aftermath of the 2020 presidential election, Scott briefly represented Donald Trump in a lawsuit related to the election results in Pennsylvania.

He earned a Bachelor of Arts at the University of Texas, Austin his Juris Doctor from South Texas College of Law Houston.

Scott resigned on December 31, 2022.

References 

Living people
Secretaries of State of Texas
South Texas College of Law alumni
Texas lawyers
Texas Republicans
University of Texas at Austin alumni
Year of birth missing (living people)